

Events

Pre-1600
 524 – The Franks are defeated by the Burgundians in the Battle of Vézeronce.
 841 – In the Battle of Fontenay-en-Puisaye, forces led by Charles the Bald and Louis the German defeat the armies of Lothair I of Italy and Pepin II of Aquitaine.
1258 – War of Saint Sabas: In the Battle of Acre, the Venetians defeat a larger Genoese fleet sailing to relieve Acre.
1530 – At the Diet of Augsburg the Augsburg Confession is presented to the Holy Roman Emperor by the Lutheran princes and Electors of Germany.

1601–1900
1658 – Spanish forces fail to retake Jamaica at the Battle of Rio Nuevo during the Anglo-Spanish War.
1678 – Venetian Elena Cornaro Piscopia is the first woman awarded a doctorate of philosophy when she graduates from the University of Padua.
1741 – Maria Theresa is crowned Queen of Hungary.
1786 – Gavriil Pribylov discovers St. George Island of the Pribilof Islands in the Bering Sea.
1788 – Virginia becomes the tenth state to ratify the United States Constitution.
1848 – A photograph of the June Days uprising becomes the first known instance of photojournalism.
1876 – Battle of the Little Bighorn and the death of Lieutenant Colonel George Armstrong Custer.
1900 – The Taoist monk Wang Yuanlu discovers the Dunhuang manuscripts, a cache of ancient texts that are of great historical and religious significance, in the Mogao Caves of Dunhuang, China.

1901–present
1906 – Pittsburgh, Pennsylvania millionaire Harry Thaw shoots and kills prominent architect Stanford White.
1910 – The United States Congress passes the Mann Act, which prohibits interstate transport of women or girls for "immoral purposes"; the ambiguous language would be used to selectively prosecute people for years to come.
  1910   – Igor Stravinsky's ballet The Firebird is premiered in Paris, bringing him to prominence as a composer.
1913 – American Civil War veterans begin arriving at the Great Reunion of 1913.
1935 – Colombia–Soviet Union relations are established.
1938 – Dr. Douglas Hyde is inaugurated as the first President of Ireland.
1940 – World War II: The French armistice with Nazi Germany comes into effect.
1941 – World War II: The Continuation War between the Soviet Union and Finland, supported by Nazi Germany, began.
1943 – The Holocaust: Jews in the Częstochowa Ghetto in Poland stage an uprising against the Nazis.
  1943   – The left-wing German Jewish exile Arthur Goldstein is murdered in Auschwitz.
1944 – World War II: The Battle of Tali-Ihantala, the largest battle ever fought in the Nordic countries, begins.
  1944   – World War II: United States Navy and British Royal Navy ships bombard Cherbourg to support United States Army units engaged in the Battle of Cherbourg.
  1944   – The final page of the comic Krazy Kat is published, exactly two months after its author George Herriman died.
1947 – The Diary of a Young Girl (better known as The Diary of Anne Frank) is published.
1948 – The United States Congress passes the Displaced Persons Act to allow World War II refugees to immigrate to the United States above quota restrictions.
1950 – The Korean War begins with the invasion of South Korea by North Korea.
1960 – Cold War: Two cryptographers working for the United States National Security Agency left for vacation to Mexico, and from there defected to the Soviet Union.
1975 – Mozambique achieves independence from Portugal.
  1975   – Prime Minister Indira Gandhi declares a state of internal emergency in India.
1976 – Missouri Governor Kit Bond issues an executive order rescinding the Extermination Order, formally apologizing on behalf of the state of Missouri for the suffering it had caused to members of the Church of Jesus Christ of Latter-day Saints.
1978 – The rainbow flag representing gay pride is flown for the first time during the San Francisco Gay Freedom Day Parade.
1981 – Microsoft is restructured to become an incorporated business in its home state of Washington.
1991 – The breakup of Yugoslavia begins when Slovenia and Croatia declare their independence from Yugoslavia.
1993 – Kim Campbell is sworn in as the first female Prime Minister of Canada.
1996 – The Khobar Towers bombing in Saudi Arabia kills 19 U.S. servicemen.
1997 – An uncrewed Progress spacecraft collides with the Russian space station Mir.
  1997   – The National Hockey League approved expansion franchises for Nashville (1998), Atlanta (1999), Columbus (2000), and Minneapolis-Saint Paul (2000).
1998 – In Clinton v. City of New York, the United States Supreme Court decides that the Line Item Veto Act of 1996 is unconstitutional.
2022 – The prime minister of Bangladesh, Sheikh Hasina inaugurates the longest bridge of Bangladesh, Padma Bridge.
  2022   – Russo-Ukrainian War: The Battle of Sievierodonetsk ends after weeks of heavy fighting with the Russian capture of the city, leading to the Battle of Lysychansk.
  2022   – Two people are killed and 21 more injured after a gunman opens fire at three sites in Oslo in a suspected Islamist anti-LGBTQ+ attack.

Births

Pre-1600

1242 – Beatrice of England (d. 1275)
1328 – William de Montagu, 2nd Earl of Salisbury, English commander (d. 1397)
1371 – Joanna II of Naples (d. 1435)
1484 – Bartholomeus V. Welser, German banker (d. 1561)
1526 – Elisabeth Parr, Marchioness of Northampton (d. 1565)
1560 – Wilhelm Fabry, German surgeon (d. 1634)
1568 – Gunilla Bielke, Queen of Sweden (d. 1597)

1601–1900
1612 – John Albert Vasa, Polish cardinal (d. 1634)
1709 – Francesco Araja, Italian composer (d. 1762)
1715 – Joseph Foullon de Doué, French soldier and politician, Controller-General of Finances (d. 1789)
1755 – Natalia Alexeievna of Russia (d. 1776)
1799 – David Douglas, Scottish-English botanist and explorer (d. 1834)
1814 – Gabriel Auguste Daubrée, French geologist and engineer (d. 1896)
1825 – James Farnell, Australian politician, 8th Premier of New South Wales (d. 1888)
1852 – Antoni Gaudí, Spanish architect, designed the Park Güell (d. 1926)
1858 – Georges Courteline, French author and playwright (d. 1929)
1860 – Gustave Charpentier, French composer and conductor (d. 1956)
1863 – Émile Francqui, Belgian soldier and diplomat (d. 1935)
1864 – Walther Nernst, German chemist and physicist, Nobel Prize laureate (d. 1941) 
1866 – Eloísa Díaz, Chilean doctor and Chile's first female physician (d. 1950)
1874 – Rose O'Neill,  American cartoonist, illustrator, artist, and writer (d. 1944)
1884 – Géza Gyóni, Hungarian soldier and poet (d. 1917)
  1884   – Daniel-Henry Kahnweiler, German-French art collector and historian (d. 1979)
1886 – Henry H. Arnold, American general (d. 1950)
1887 – George Abbott, American director, producer, and screenwriter (d. 1995)
  1887   – Frigyes Karinthy, Hungarian author, poet, and journalist (d. 1938)
1892 – Shirō Ishii, Japanese microbiologist and general (d. 1959)
1894 – Hermann Oberth, Romanian-German physicist and engineer (d. 1989)
1898 – Kay Sage, American painter and poet (d. 1963)
1900 – Marta Abba, Italian actress (d. 1988)
  1900   – Zinaida Aksentyeva, Ukrainian/Soviet astronomer (d. 1969)
  1900   – Georgia Hale, American silent film actress and real estate investor (d. 1985)
  1900   – Louis Mountbatten, 1st Earl Mountbatten of Burma, English admiral and politician, 44th Governor-General of India (d. 1979)

1901–present
1901 – Harold Roe Bartle, American businessman and politician, 47th Mayor of Kansas City (d. 1974)
1902 – Yasuhito, Prince Chichibu of Japan (d. 1953)
1903 – George Orwell, British novelist, essayist, and critic (d. 1950)
  1903   – Anne Revere, American actress (d. 1990)
1905 – Rupert Wildt, German-American astronomer and academic (d. 1976)
1907 – J. Hans D. Jensen, German physicist and academic, Nobel Prize laureate (d. 1973)
1908 – Willard Van Orman Quine, American philosopher and academic (d. 2000)
1911 – William Howard Stein, American chemist and biologist, Nobel Prize laureate (d. 1980)
1912 – William T. Cahill, American lawyer and politician, 46th Governor of New Jersey (d. 1996)
1913 – Cyril Fletcher, English actor and screenwriter (d. 2005)
1915 – Whipper Billy Watson, Canadian-American wrestler and trainer (d. 1990)
1917 – Nils Karlsson, Swedish skier (d. 2012)
  1917   – Claude Seignolle, French author (d. 2018)
1918 – P. H. Newby, English soldier and author (d. 1997)
1920 – Lassie Lou Ahern, American actress (d. 2018)
1921 – Celia Franca, English-Canadian ballerina and choreographer, founded the National Ballet of Canada (d. 2007)
1922 – Johnny Smith, American guitarist and songwriter (d. 2013)
1923 – Sam Francis, American soldier and painter (d. 1994)
  1923   – Dorothy Gilman, American author (d. 2012)
  1923   – Jamshid Amouzegar, 43rd Prime Minister of Iran (d. 2016)
1924 – Sidney Lumet, American director, producer, and screenwriter (d. 2011)
1924 – Dimitar Isakov, Bulgarian football player
  1924   – Madan Mohan, Iraqi-Indian composer and director (d. 1975)
  1924   – William J. Castagna, American lawyer and judge (d. 2020)
1925 – June Lockhart, American actress
  1925   – Robert Venturi, American architect and academic (d. 2018)
  1925   – Virginia Patton, American actress and businesswoman (d. 2022)
1926 – Ingeborg Bachmann, Austrian author and poet (d. 1973)
  1926   – Kep Enderby, Australian lawyer, judge, and politician, 23rd Attorney-General for Australia (d. 2015)
  1926   – Stig Sollander, Swedish Alpine skier (d. 2019)
1927 – Antal Róka, Hungarian runner (d. 1970)
  1927   – Arnold Wolfendale, English astronomer and academic (d. 2020)
1928 – Alexei Alexeyevich Abrikosov, Russian-American physicist and academic, Nobel Prize laureate (d. 2017)
  1928   – Michel Brault, Canadian director, producer, and screenwriter (d. 2013)
  1928   – Peyo, Belgian author and illustrator, created The Smurfs (d. 1992)
1929 – Eric Carle, American author and illustrator (d. 2021) 
  1929   – Francesco Marchisano, Italian cardinal (d. 2014)
1931 – V. P. Singh, Indian lawyer and politician, 7th Prime Minister of India (d. 2008)
1932 – Peter Blake, English painter and illustrator
  1932   – George Sluizer, French-Dutch director, producer, and screenwriter (d. 2014)
1933 – Álvaro Siza Vieira, Portuguese architect, designed the Porto School of Architecture
1934 – Jean Geissinger, American baseball player (d. 2014)
  1934   – Jack W. Hayford, American minister and author
  1934   – Beatriz Sheridan, Mexican actress and director (d. 2006)
1935 – Ray Butt, English television producer and director (d. 2013)
  1935   – Salihu Ibrahim, Nigerian Army Officer (d. 2018)
  1935   – Taufiq Ismail, Indonesian poet and activist
  1935   – Larry Kramer, American author, playwright, and activist, co-founded Gay Men's Health Crisis (d. 2020)
  1935   – Don Demeter, American professional baseball player (d. 2021)
  1935   – Tony Lanfranchi, English racing driver (d. 2004)
  1935   – Judy Howe, American artistic gymnast
  1935   – Charles Sheffield, English-American mathematician, physicist, and author (d. 2002)
1936 – B. J. Habibie, Indonesian engineer and politician, 3rd President of Indonesia (d. 2019)
  1936   – Bert Hölldobler, German biologist and entomologist
1937 – Eddie Floyd, American R&B/soul singer-songwriter
  1937   – Derek Foster, Baron Foster of Bishop Auckland, English politician (d. 2019)
  1937   – Doreen Wells, English ballerina and actress
1939 – Allen Fox, American tennis player and coach
1940 – Judy Amoore, Australian runner
  1940   – Mary Beth Peil, American actress and singer
  1940   – A. J. Quinnell, English-Maltese author (d. 2005)
  1940   – Clint Warwick, English bass player (d. 2004)
1941 – Denys Arcand, Canadian director, producer, and screenwriter
  1941   – John Albert Raven, Scottish academic and ecologist 
1942 – Patricia Brake, English actress (d. 2022)
  1942   – Nikiforos Diamandouros, Greek academic and politician
  1942   – Willis Reed, American basketball player, coach, and manager
  1942   – Michel Tremblay, Canadian author and playwright
1943 – Carly Simon, American singer-songwriter
1944 – Robert Charlebois, Canadian singer-songwriter, guitarist, and actor
  1944   – Gary David Goldberg, American screenwriter and producer (d. 2013)
 1945   – Baba Gana Kingibe, Nigerian politician
  1945   – Harry Womack, American singer (d. 1974)
1946 – Roméo Dallaire, Dutch-Canadian general and politician
  1946   – Allen Lanier, American guitarist and songwriter (d. 2013)
  1946   – Ian McDonald, English guitarist and saxophonist (d. 2022) 
1947 – John Powell, American discus thrower
1949 – Richard Clarke, Irish archbishop
  1949   – Patrick Tambay, French racing driver (d. 2022) 
  1949   – Yoon Joo-sang, South Korean actor
1950 – Marcello Toninelli, Italian author and screenwriter
1951 – Eva Bayer-Fluckiger, Swiss mathematician and academic
1952 – Péter Erdő, Hungarian cardinal 
  1952   – Tim Finn, New Zealand singer-songwriter 
  1952   – Martin Gerschwitz, German singer-songwriter and keyboard player 
  1952   – Kristina Abelli Elander, Swedish artist
1953 – Olivier Ameisen, French-American cardiologist and educator (d. 2013)
  1953   – Ian Davis, Australian cricketer
1954 – Mario Lessard, Canadian ice hockey player
  1954   – David Paich, American singer-songwriter, keyboard player, and producer
  1954   – Lina Romay, Spanish actress (d. 2012)
  1954   – Daryush Shokof, Iranian director, producer, and screenwriter
  1954   – Sonia Sotomayor, American lawyer and jurist, Associate Justice of the Supreme Court of the United States
1955 – Vic Marks, English cricketer and sportscaster
1956 – Anthony Bourdain, American chef and author (d. 2018)
  1956   – Frank Paschek, German long jumper
  1956   – Boris Trajkovski, Macedonian politician, 2nd President of the Republic of Macedonia (d. 2004)
  1956   – Craig Young, Australian rugby player and coach
1957 – Greg Millen, Canadian ice hockey player and sportscaster
1958 – George Becali, Romanian businessman, politician
1959 – Lutz Dombrowski, German long jumper and educator
  1959   – Jari Puikkonen, Finnish ski jumper
  1959   – Bobbie Vaile, Australian astrophysicist and astronomer (d. 1996)
1960 – Alastair Bruce of Crionaich, English-Scottish journalist and author
  1960   – Brian Hayward, Canadian ice hockey player and sportscaster
  1960   – Craig Johnston, South African-Australian footballer and photographer
  1960   – Laurent Rodriguez, French rugby player
1961 – Timur Bekmambetov, Kazakh director, producer, and screenwriter
  1961   – Ricky Gervais, English comedian, actor, director, producer and singer
1963 – John Benjamin Hickey, American actor
  1963   – Yann Martel, Spanish-Canadian author
  1963   – Doug Gilmour, Canadian ice hockey player and manager
  1963   – George Michael, English singer-songwriter and producer (d. 2016)
  1963   – Mike Stanley, American baseball player
1964 – Dell Curry, American basketball player and coach
  1964   – Phil Emery, Australian cricketer
  1964   – Johnny Herbert, English racing driver and sportscaster
  1964   – John McCrea, American singer-songwriter and musician
  1964   – Greg Raymer, American poker player and lawyer
1965 – Napole Polutele, French politician
  1965   – Kerri Pottharst, Australian beach volleyball player
  1965   – Joseph Hii Teck Kwong, Malaysian bishop
1966 – Dikembe Mutombo, Congolese-American basketball player
1967 – Tracey Spicer, Australian journalist 
1968 – Adrian Garvey, Zimbabwean-South African rugby player
  1968   – Vaios Karagiannis, Greek footballer and manager
1969 – Hunter Foster, American actor and singer
  1969   – Zim Zum, American guitarist and songwriter
  1969   – Kevin Kelley, American football coach
1970 – Ariel Gore, American journalist and author
  1970   – Roope Latvala, Finnish guitarist 
  1970   – Erki Nool, Estonian decathlete and politician
  1970   – Aaron Sele, American baseball player and scout
1971 – Karen Darke, English cyclist and author
  1971   – Jason Gallian, Australian-English cricketer and educator
  1971   – Rod Kafer, Australian rugby player and sportscaster
  1971   – Neil Lennon, Northern Irish-Scottish footballer and manager
  1971   – Michael Tucker, American baseball player
1972 – Carlos Delgado, Puerto Rican-American baseball player and coach
  1972   – Saif al-Islam Gaddafi, Libyan engineer and politician
1973 – Milan Hnilička, Czech ice hockey player
  1973   – Jamie Redknapp, English footballer and coach
1974 – Nisha Ganatra, Canadian director, producer, and screenwriter
  1974   – Glen Metropolit, Canadian ice hockey player
1975 – Kiur Aarma, Estonian journalist and producer
  1975   – Linda Cardellini, American actress
  1975   – Albert Costa, Spanish tennis player and coach
  1975   – Vladimir Kramnik, Russian chess player
  1975   – Michele Merkin, American model and television host
1976 – José Cancela, Uruguayan footballer
  1976   – Carlos Nieto, Argentinian-Italian rugby player
  1976   – Neil Walker, American swimmer
1978 – Aramis Ramírez, Dominican-American baseball player
1979 – Richard Hughes, Scottish footballer
  1979   – Busy Philipps, American actress
1981 – Simon Ammann, Swiss ski jumper
1982 – Rain, South Korean singer and actor
  1982   – Mikhail Youzhny, Russian tennis player  
1983 – Marc Janko, Austrian footballer
1984 – Lauren Bush, American model and fashion designer
1985 – Karim Matmour, Algerian footballer
1986 – Aya Matsuura, Japanese singer and actress 
1988 – Jhonas Enroth, Swedish ice hockey player
  1988   – Miguel Layún, Mexican footballer
  1988   – Therese Johaug, Norwegian cross-country skier
1990 – Andi Eigenmann, Filipino actress
1996 – Pietro Fittipaldi, Brazilian-American race car driver
  1996   – Sione Mata'utia, Australian rugby league player
  1996   – Lele Pons, Latina-American Internet personality
1998 – Kyle Chalmers, Australian swimmer

Deaths

Pre-1600
 635 – Gao Zu, Chinese emperor (b. 566)
 841 – Gerard of Auvergne, Frankish nobleman
   841   – Ricwin of Nantes, Frankish nobleman
 891 – Sunderolt, German archbishop
 931 – An Chonghui, Chinese general
1014 – Æthelstan Ætheling, son of Æthelred the Unready
1031 – Sheng Zong, Chinese emperor (b. 972)
1134 – Niels, king of Denmark (b. 1065)
1218 – Simon de Montfort, 5th Earl of Leicester, French politician, Lord High Steward (b. 1160)
1291 – Eleanor of Provence, queen of England (b. 1223)
1337 – Frederick III, king of Sicily (b. 1272)
1394 – Dorothea of Montau, German hermitess (b. 1347)
1483 – Anthony Woodville, 2nd Earl Rivers, English courtier and translator (b. 1440)
  1483   – Richard Grey, half brother of Edward V of England (b. 1458)
1522 – Franchinus Gaffurius, Italian composer and theorist (b. 1451)
1533 – Mary Tudor, queen of France (b. 1496)
1579 – Hatano Hideharu, Japanese warlord (b. 1541)
1593 – Michele Mercati, Italian physician and archaeologist (b. 1541)

1601–1900
1634 – John Marston, English poet and playwright (b. 1576)
1638 – Juan Pérez de Montalbán, Spanish author, poet, and playwright (b. 1602)
1665 – Sigismund Francis, archduke of Austria (b. 1630)
1669 – François de Vendôme, duke of Beaufort (b. 1616)
1671 – Giovanni Battista Riccioli, Italian priest and astronomer (b. 1598)
1673 – Charles de Batz-Castelmore d'Artagnan, French captain (b. 1611)
1686 – Simon Ushakov, Russian painter and educator (b. 1626)
1715 – Jean-Baptiste du Casse, French admiral and politician (b. 1646)
1767 – Georg Philipp Telemann, German composer and theorist (b. 1681)
1798 – Thomas Sandby, English cartographer, painter, and architect (b. 1721)
1822 – E. T. A. Hoffmann, German composer, critic, and jurist (b. 1776)
1835 – Ebenezer Pemberton, American educator (b. 1746)
1838 – François-Nicolas-Benoît Haxo, French general and engineer (b. 1774)
1861 – Abdülmecid I, Ottoman sultan (b. 1823)
1866 – Alexander von Nordmann, Finnish biologist and paleontologist (b. 1803)
1868 – Carlo Matteucci, Italian physicist and neurophysiologist (b. 1811)
1870 – David Heaton, American lawyer and politician (b. 1823)
1875 – Antoine-Louis Barye, French sculptor (b. 1796)
1876 – James Calhoun, American lieutenant (b. 1845)
  1876   – Boston Custer, American civilian army contractor (b. 1848)
  1876   – George Armstrong Custer, American general (b. 1839)
  1876   – Thomas Custer, American officer, Medal of Honor recipient (b. 1845)
  1876   – Myles Keogh, Irish-American officer (b. 1840)
1882 – François Jouffroy, French sculptor (b. 1806)
1884 – Hans Rott, Austrian organist and composer (b. 1858)
1886 – Jean-Louis Beaudry, Canadian businessman and politician, 11th Mayor of Montreal (b. 1809)
1894 – Marie François Sadi Carnot, French engineer and politician, 5th President of France (b. 1837)

1901–present
1906 – Stanford White, American architect, designed the Washington Square Arch (b. 1853)
1912 – Lawrence Alma-Tadema, Dutch-British painter (b. 1836)
1916 – Thomas Eakins, American painter, photographer, and sculptor (b. 1844)
1917 – Géza Gyóni, Hungarian soldier and poet (b. 1884)
1918 – Jake Beckley, American baseball player and coach (b. 1867)
1922 – Satyendranath Dutta, Indian poet and author (b. 1882)
1937 – Colin Clive, British actor (b. 1900)
1939 – Richard Seaman, English race car driver (b. 1913)
1943 – Arthur Goldstein, German Jewish left-wing activist (c. 1887)
1944 – Dénes Berinkey, Hungarian jurist and politician, 18th Prime Minister of Hungary (b. 1871)
  1944   – Lucha Reyes, Mexican singer and actress (b. 1906)
1947 – Jimmy Doyle, American boxer (b. 1924)
1948 – William C. Lee, American general (b. 1895)
1949 – Buck Freeman, American baseball player (b. 1871)
  1949   – James Steen, American water polo player (b. 1876)
1950 – Maurice O'Sullivan, Irish police officer and author (b. 1904)
1958 – Alfred Noyes, English author, poet, and playwright (b. 1880)
1959 – Charles Starkweather, American spree killer (b. 1938)
1960 – Tommy Corcoran, American baseball player and manager (b. 1869)
1968 – Tony Hancock, English comedian and actor (b. 1924)
1971 – John Boyd Orr, 1st Baron Boyd-Orr, Scottish physician, biologist, and politician, Nobel Prize laureate (b. 1880)
1972 – Jan Matulka, Czech-American painter and illustrator (b. 1890)
1974 – Cornelius Lanczos, Hungarian mathematician and physicist (b. 1893)
1976 – Johnny Mercer, American singer-songwriter, co-founded Capitol Records (b. 1909)
1977 – Olave Baden-Powell, British Girl Guiding and Girl Scouting leader (b. 1889)
  1977   – Endre Szervánszky, Hungarian pianist and composer (b. 1911)
1979 – Dave Fleischer, American animator, director, and producer (b. 1894)
  1979   – Philippe Halsman, Latvian-American photographer (b. 1906)
1981 – Felipe Cossío del Pomar, Peruvian painter and political activist (b. 1888)
1983 – Alberto Ginastera, Argentinian pianist and composer (b. 1916)
1984 – Michel Foucault, French historian and philosopher (b. 1926)
1988 – Hillel Slovak, Israeli-American guitarist and songwriter (b. 1962)
1990 – Ronald Gene Simmons, American sergeant and murderer (b. 1940)
1992 – Jerome Brown, American football player (b. 1965)
1995 – Warren E. Burger, Fifteenth Chief Justice of the United States (b. 1907)
  1995   – Ernest Walton, Irish physicist and academic, Nobel Prize laureate (b. 1903)
1996 – Arthur Snelling, English civil servant and diplomat, British Ambassador to South Africa (b. 1914)
1997 – Jacques Cousteau, French oceanographer and explorer (b. 1910)
2002 – Jean Corbeil, Canadian politician, 29th Canadian Minister of Labour (b. 1934)
2003 – Lester Maddox, American businessman and politician, 75th Governor of Georgia (b. 1915)
2004 – Morton Coutts, New Zealand inventor (b. 1904)
2005 – John Fiedler, American actor and voice artist (b. 1925)
  2005   – Kâzım Koyuncu, Turkish singer-songwriter and activist (b. 1971)
2006 – Jaap Penraat, Dutch-American humanitarian (b. 1918)
2007 – J. Fred Duckett, American journalist and educator (b. 1933)
  2007   – Jeeva, Indian director, cinematographer, and screenwriter (b. 1963)
2008 – Lyall Watson, South African anthropologist and ethologist (b. 1939)
2009 – Farrah Fawcett, American actress and producer (b. 1947)
  2009   – Michael Jackson, American singer-songwriter, producer, dancer, and actor (b. 1958)
  2009   – Sky Saxon, American singer-songwriter (b. 1937)
2010 – Alan Plater, English playwright and screenwriter (b. 1935)
  2010   – Richard B. Sellars, American businessman and philanthropist (b. 1915)
2011 – Annie Easley, American computer scientist and mathematician (b. 1933)
  2011   – Goff Richards, English composer and conductor (b. 1944)
  2011   – Margaret Tyzack, English actress (b. 1931)
2012 – Shigemitsu Dandō, Japanese academic and jurist (b. 1913)
  2012   – Campbell Gillies, Scottish jockey (b. 1990)
  2012   – George Randolph Hearst, Jr., American businessman (b. 1927)
  2012   – Lucella MacLean, American baseball player (b. 1921)
  2012   – Edgar Ross, American boxer (b. 1949)
2013 – George Burditt, American screenwriter and producer (b. 1923)
  2013   – Catherine Gibson, Scottish swimmer (b. 1931)
  2013   – Robert E. Gilka, American photographer and journalist (b. 1916)
  2013   – Harry Parker, American rower and coach (b. 1935)
  2013   – Mildred Ladner Thompson, American journalist (b. 1918)
  2013   – Green Wix Unthank, American soldier and judge (b. 1923)
2014 – Nigel Calder, English journalist, author, and screenwriter (b. 1931)
  2014   – Ana María Matute, Spanish author and academic (b. 1925)
  2014   – Ivan Plyushch, Ukrainian agronomist and politician (b. 1941)
2015 – Patrick Macnee, English actor (b. 1922)
  2015   – Nerses Bedros XIX Tarmouni, Egyptian-Armenian patriarch (b. 1940)
2016 – Adam Small, South African writer of apartheid-period (b. 1936)
2018 – Richard Benjamin Harrison, American businessman and reality television personality (b. 1941)
  2018   – David Goldblatt, South African photographer of apartheid-period (b. 1930)

Holidays and observances
Arbor Day (Philippines)
Christian feast day:
David of Munktorp
Eurosia
Maximus (Massimo) of Turin
Philipp Melanchthon (Evangelical Lutheran Church in America)
Presentation of the Augsburg Confession (Lutheran)
Prosper of Aquitaine
Prosper of Reggio
William of Montevergine
June 25 (Eastern Orthodox liturgics)
Independence Day, celebrates the independence of Mozambique from Portugal in 1975. 
National Catfish Day (United States)
Statehood Day (Slovenia)
Statehood Day (Virginia)
Teacher's Day (Guatemala) 
World Vitiligo Day

References

External links

 
 
 

Days of the year
June